Semioptila banghaasi is a moth in the Himantopteridae family. It was described by Erich Martin Hering in 1937. It is found in the Democratic Republic of the Congo and Tanzania.

References

Moths described in 1937
Himantopteridae